Elaeocarpus rugosus is a species of flowering plant in the Elaeocarpaceae family. It a tree is found in Peninsular Malaysia and Singapore. It is threatened by habitat loss.

References

rugosus
Trees of Malaya
Vulnerable plants
Taxonomy articles created by Polbot